John Ching Sung Lau was the former Chief Executive Officer and President of Husky Energy. Prior to joining Husky, John Lau served in various senior executive roles in Cheung Kong (Holdings) and Hutchison Whampoa Limited group of companies.

Career 
John C. S. Lau took over the position as Chief Executive Officer and President of Husky Energy in 2000. 
Lau retired from Husky Energy in 2011 and continues to be advisor and consultant to global oil and gas companies.

Awards 
John Lau was a recipient of the Queen’s Golden Jubilee Medal, the Alberta Centennial Award, and the Saskatchewan Centennial Medal. He also received the Distinguished Service Award from the Province of Saskatchewan.

On 26 August 2000, John was named an honorary chief of the Frog Lake First Nation.

External links 
 Husky Energy

References 

Canadian chief executives
Living people
Year of birth missing (living people)